The Adi Parva or The Book of the Beginning is the first of eighteen books of the Mahabharata. "Ādi" (आदि) in Sanskrit means "first".

Adi Parva traditionally has 19 parts and 236 adhyayas (chapters). The critical edition of Adi Parva has 19 parts and 225 chapters.

Adi Parva describes how the epic came to be recited by Ugrasrava Sauti to the assembled rishis at the Naimisha Forest after first having been narrated at the sarpasatra of Janamejaya by Vaishampayana at Taxila. It includes an outline of contents from the eighteen books, along with the book's significance. The history of the Bhāratas and the Bhrigus are described. The main part of the work covers the birth and early life of the princes of the Kuru Kingdom and the persecution of the Pandavas by Dhritarashtra.

Structure and chapters

The Adi Parva consists of 19 upa-parvas or parts (also referred to as little books). Each part is also called a parva and is further subdivided into chapters, for a total of 236 chapters in Adi Parva. The following are the sub-parvas:

 1. Anukramanika Parva (Chapter: 1)
 Sauti meets the Rishis led by Shaunaka in Naimisha Forest. They express a desire to hear Mahabharata. He explains the stories of creation to them. He narrates the story of how the Mahabharata was written. This parva describes the significance of Mahabharata, claims comprehensive synthesis of all human knowledge, and why it must be studied.

 2. Sangraha Parva (Chapter: 2)
 Story of Samantha Panchaka. Definition of Akshauhini in an army. Outline of contents of 18 books of Mahabharata.

 3. Paushya Parva (Chapter: 3)
 Story of Sarama's curse on Janamejaya, of Aruni, Upamanyu and Veda (The disciples of Sage Dhaumya) and of Uttanka, Paushya and sage Veda.

 4. Pauloma Parva (Chapters: 4–12)
 History of the Bhargava race of men. Story of Chyavana's birth.

 5. Astika Parva (Chapters: 13–58)
 Story of the Churning of the Ocean. Theories on dharma, worldly bondage and release. Story of the Sarpa Satra including Janamejaya's vow to kill all snakes, step to annihilate them with a sacrificial fire, decision to apply Ahimsa (non-violence) to snakes and all life forms. Story of birth of Astika. Story of how Vaishampayana came to narrate the Mahabharata to Janamejaya.

 6. Adivansavatarana Parva  Anshavatarana Parva (Chapters: 59–64)
 History of Pandava and Kuru princes. Stories of Shantanu, Bhishma and Satyavati. Stories of Karna's birth, Lord Krishna's birth and of and Animandavya. Appeal to Brahma that the gods should reincarnate to save the chaos that earth has become.

 7. Sambhava Parva (Chapters: 65–142)
 Theory of life on earth and of gods. Story of Dronacharya, Kripacharya,Ashwatthama and other sages. Story of Dushyanta and Shakuntala. Story of Bharata's birth. Sakuntala goes to Dushyanta with the boy. He first refuses to remember her and their marriage but later apologizes and accepts. Bharata becomes prince. Stories of Yayati, Devayani and Sharmishtha. Stories of Yadu, Puru and the Paurava race of men. The Pandava brothers retreat into the forest, chased by Dhritarashtra. The stories the Swayamvara of Kunti, marriage of Madri and marriage of Vidura. Attempts to reconcile the conflict between Kauravas and Pandavas.

 8. Jatugriha Parva  Jatugriha-daha Parva (Chapters: 143–153)
 Kanika counsels Dhritarashtra on how to rule a kingdom and on  how deception is an effective tool for governance and war, against enemies and potential competition. Kanika narrates his symbolic tale about jackal, tiger, mouse, mongoose and deer and he advises that a weak ruler should ignore his own weaknesses and focus on other people's weakness and pretend to be friends while being cruel and destructive to others, particularly when the competition is good and stronger. Dhritarashtra schemes to build a home for Pandavas in the forest, from lacquer and other inflammable materials as a friendly gesture, but with plans to burn them alive on the darkest night. Kanika's theory is called wicked and evil by Vidura, a sage of true knowledge and the good, who is also the advisor and friend to Pandavas. Vidura and Pandavas plan escape by building a tunnel inside the inflammable house. The fire is lit and the Pandavas escape. Dhritarashtra falsely believes Pandavas are dead. Duryodhana is pleased and sets on ruling the kingdom.

 9. Hidimva-vadha Parva (Chapters: 154–158)
 The story of the wanderings of Pandava brothers after the escape from the fire. Story of Bhima and the Rakshashi Hidimba. She falls in love with Bhima and refuses to help her brother. The story of the battle between Bhima and Hidimba's demon brother, Hidimbasur, showing the enormous strength of the giant brother Bhima. Bhima and Hidimba have a son named Ghatotkacha.

 10. Vaka-vadha Parva  Baka-vadha Parva (Chapters: 159–166)
 The life of Pandavas brothers in Ekachakra. Story about Bhima slaying another demon Bakasura, who has been terrorizing people of Ekachakra. Heroine of Mahabharata, Draupadi, is born in holy fire. Word spreads that the Pandavas may be alive.

 11. Chaitraratha Parva (Chapters: 167–185)
 Pandavas set out for Panchala. Arjuna fights with a Gandharva.  Stories of Tapati and the conflict between Vashistha and Vishwamitra. Stories of Kalmashapada, Parashara and Aurva. Dehumanization and persecution of Bhargava race of men.

 12. Swayamvara Parva (Chapters: 186–194)
 The Pandavas arrive in Panchala. Draupadi's swayamvara. The Pandavas arrive at the swayamvara in disguise of Brahmanas. Arjuna excels in the swayamvara and wins Draupadi's heart and hand. Krishna recognizes the individuals in disguise as the Pandava brothers. The suitors object the marriage of Draupadi and Arjuna, a fight ensues. Bhima and Arjuna defeat all the suitors and then takes Draupadi to their cottage. Kunti thinking Draupadi as alms commands her to be shared by the five brothers. Dhrishtadyumna gets to know the true identity of Pandavas. 

 13. Vaivahika Parva (Chapters: 195–201)
 Drupada is delighted at discovering that the Pandavas are alive. The Pandavas come to Drupada's palace. The story of Draupadi's previous lives and Indra punished by Shiva. The marriage of Draupadi with the Pandavas.

 14. Viduragamana Parva (Chapters: 202–209)
 Vidura's attempt to reconcile the evil Kaurava brothers and the good Pandava brothers. Various speeches by Karna, Bhishma, Drona and Vidura. Pandavas return to Hastinapur with the blessings of Krishna. The construction of the city Indraprastha.

 15. Rajya-labha Parva (Chapters: 210–214)
 Story of Sunda and Upasunda and of Narada.

 16. Arjuna-vanavasa Parva (Chapters: 215–220)
Arjuna violates dharma. He accepts voluntary exile. Arjuna marries Ulupi and Chitrangada, and rescues Apsaras. Story highlights his special powers and competence. Arjuna and Krishna become close friends. Arjuna goes to Dwarka, lives with Krishna.

 17. Subhadra-harana Parva (Chapters: 221–222)
 Arjuna falls in love with and takes away Subhadra, Krishna's sister. The upset Vrishnis prepare war with Arjuna, but finally desist.

 18. Harana-harana Parva  Harana-harika Parva (Chapter: 223)
 Arjuna returns from exile, with Subhadra. They marry. Their son Abhimanyu is born. Story of the Upapandavas, the five sons of Draupadi.

 19. Khandava-Daha Parva (Chapters: 224–236)
 The reign of Yudhishthira. Krishna and Arjuna go to the banks of Yamuna, where they meet Agni, disguised as a Brahmin, who demands to consume the Khandava forest, to cure his digestive ailment. Stories of Swetaki, and Agni. Agni gives Arjuna the Gandiva bow and the ape-bannered chariot, while Krishna receives the discus. Agni starts consuming the forest when Indra and other deities obstruct. The fight of Krishna and Arjuna with celestials, their combined abilities, and their victory. Story of Aswasena (Son of Takshaka), Mandapala and the his four bird sons. Maya rescued by Arjuna.

English translations

Adi Parva and other books of Mahabharata are written in Sanskrit. Several translations of the Adi Parva are available in English. To translations whose copyrights have expired and which are in public domain, include those by Kisari Mohan Ganguli  and Manmatha Nath Dutt. 

The translations are not consistent in parts and vary with each translator's interpretations. For example:

Translation by Manmatha Nath Dutt:

Translation by Kisari Mohan Ganguli:

The total number of original verses depend on which Sanskrit source is used, and these do not equal the totalnumber of translated verses in each chapter, in both Ganguli and Dutt translations. Mahabharata, like many ancient Sanskrit texts, was transmitted across generations verbally, a practice that was a source of corruption of its text, deletion of verses as well as the addition of extraneous verses over time. Some of these suspect verses have been identified by change in style and integrity of meter in the verses. The structure, prose, meter and style of translations vary within chapters between the translating authors.

Debroy, in his 2011 overview of Mahabharata, notes that updated critical edition of Adi Parva, with spurious and corrupted text removed, has 19 parts, 225 adhyayas (chapters) and 7,205 shlokas (verses).

Quotations and teachings

Anukramanika Parva, Chapter 1:

Sangraha Parva, Chapter 2:

Paushya Parva, Chapter 3:

Adivansabatarana Parva, Chapter 62:

Sambhava Parva, Chapter 73:

Sambhava Parva, Chapter 74:

Sambhava Parva, Chapter 79:

Sambhava Parva, Chapter 133:

Viduragamana Parva, Chapter 206:

See also
 Next book of Mahabharata: Sabha Parva

References

External links
 Sanskrit classics including Mahabharata Brown University Archives, with original, translations and commentaries by scholars
 Adi Parva Mahabharata, Translated by Manmatha Nath Dutt (1894)
 English Translation by Kisari Mohan Ganguli
 English Translation Readable, with various research tools, Translated by Kisari Mohan Ganguli, another archive
 Adi Parva in Sanskrit by Vyasadeva and commentary by Nilakantha (Editor: Kinjawadekar, 1929)
 French translation of Le Mahabharata, Adi Parva, by H. Fauche (Paris, 1868)
 A review of critical, less corrupted edition of Adi Parva by Vishnu S. Sukthankar; Reviewed by Franklin Edgerton, Journal of the American Oriental Society, Vol. 48, (1928), pages 186-190

Parvas in Mahabharata